Vegas 96 is a triple live album from the American jam band Phish, recorded live at the Aladdin Theatre in Las Vegas, Nevada, on December 6, 1996. In addition to the 3-CD set, a limited edition box version also includes a DVD with archival footage from the show and an extensive 40-page bound-book featuring photos and notes.

The show features a large amount of extended improvisation on Phish classics such as "Harry Hood" and "Weekapaug Groove", as well as a cover of Frank Zappa's "Peaches en Regalia". The encore features a half-hour version of "Harpua" with guest appearances from Les Claypool and Larry LaLonde of the band Primus, John McEuen of the Nitty Gritty Dirt Band, actor Courtney Gains from Children of the Corn, a group of Elvis impersonators, and a pair known as the "Yodeling Cowgirls", who performed "I Want to Be a Cowboy's Sweetheart", accompanied by John McEuen of the Nitty Gritty Dirt Band on a pedal-steel guitar.

The Yodeling Cowgirls, from Phoenix, Arizona, are Heather August and Anamieke Carrozza, who had met Phish at their Phoenix concert days earlier.

In addition to being a CD release, this concert is available as a download in FLAC and MP3 formats at LivePhish.com. Selected songs are available for MPEG-4 download.

Track listing

Disc one
Set one:
"Wilson" (Anastasio, Marshall, Woolf) - 6:22
"Peaches en Regalia" (Zappa) - 3:10
"Poor Heart" (Gordon) - 3:18
"2001" (Deodato) - 9:27
"Llama" (Anastasio) - 5:26
"You Enjoy Myself" (Anastasio) - 26:00
"Cars Trucks Buses" (McConnell) - 4:09
"Down with Disease" (Anastasio, Marshall) - 11:04
"Frankenstein" (Winter) - 4:55

Disc two
Set two:
"Julius" (Anastasio, Marshall) - 9:34
"Sparkle" (Anastasio, Marshall) - 3:37
"Mike's Song" (Gordon) - 10:53
"Simple" (Gordon) - 18:33
"Harry Hood" (Anastasio, Fishman, Gordon, Long, McConnell) - 15:40
"Weekapaug Groove" (Anastasio, Fishman, Gordon, McConnell) - 11:35
"Sweet Adeline" (Armstrong, Gerard) - 1:54
"Good Times Bad Times" (Bonham, Jones, Page, Plant) - 7:18

Disc three
Encore:
"Harpua" (Anastasio, Fishman) - 4:03
"Wildwood Weed" (Bowman, Stafford) - 2:43
"Harpua" (Anastasio, Fishman) - 4:21
"I Want to Be a Cowboy's Sweetheart" (Montana) - 2:17
"Harpua" (Anastasio, Fishman) - 1:55
"Suspicious Minds" (James) - 4:28
"Harpua" (Anastasio, Fishman) - 8:47
"Suzy Greenberg" (Anastasio, Pollak) - 6:52
"Susie Q" (Broadwater, Hawkins, Lewis) - 2:47

Bonus disc - Road to Vegas
"Split Open and Melt" (Anastasio) - 11:04
recorded November 9, 1996
"Tweezer" (Anastasio, Fishman, Gordon, McConnell) - 16:58
recorded November 3, 1996
"Bathtub Gin" (Anastasio, Goodman) - 26:31
recorded November 7, 1996
"Simple" (Gordon) - 16:37
recorded November 18, 1996
"Amazing Grace" (Traditional) - 6:07
recorded November 30, 1996

Personnel
Phish
 Trey Anastasio - guitars, lead vocals, acapella vocals on "Sweet Adeline"
 Page McConnell - keyboards, backing vocals, acapella vocals on "Sweet Adeline"
 Mike Gordon - bass guitar, backing vocals, lead vocals on "Poor Heart" and "Mike's Song", acapella vocals on "Sweet Adeline"
 Jon Fishman - drums, backing vocals, acapella vocals on "Sweet Adeline"

Guests
 Les Claypool - bass guitar on "Harpua", "Wildwood Weed", "Suspicious Minds", "Suzy Greenberg" and "Susie Q", lead vocals on "Wildwood Weed"
 Larry LaLonde - guitar on  "Harpua", "Wildwood Weed", "Suspicious Minds", "Suzy Greenberg" and "Susie Q"
 John McEuen - slide guitar on "I Want to Be a Cowboy's Sweetheart"
 Heather August and Anamieke Carrozza - vocals on "I Want to Be a Cowboy's Sweetheart"
 Courtney Gains - percussion on "Suzy Greenberg"

Guests on Road to Vegas
 Karl Perazzo - percussion on "Tweezer"
 Peter Apfelbaum - tenor saxophone on "Amazing Grace"
 John McEuen - slide guitar on "Amazing Grace"

References

Jammy Award winners
LivePhish.com Downloads
Phish live albums
2007 live albums
Albums recorded at Planet Hollywood Resort & Casino